Iczer One, known in Japan as , is a 1983 sci-fi horror and yuri manga published in the hentai magazine Lemon People. It was created by Aran Rei. In 1985 the story was adapted into a three part Original Video Animation directed by Toshihiro Hirano. The story is of an alien invasion of Earth, which is opposed by Iczer-One and her schoolgirl companion Nagisa. Together they can pilot the Iczer-Robo, a giant humanoid robot. The story features strong body horror.

Iczer-1 also featured two "sound novel" dramas released. The first sound novel was released on an LP record, and was based on the first volume of the Iczer-1 manga, entitled Golden Warrior Iczer-One. The second drama CD is a crossover with the anime Dangaioh.

OVA Story
According to their initial strategy, the Cthulhu use parasitic creatures, called , to infest and replace humans across the world. Their hope is to eradicate humanity and take the world without damaging it in an open war. However, Iczer-1 appears and begins rooting out and destroying the vedims. Upon learning this, the Cthulhu plan to initiate a full military invasion of Earth.

Ultimately she chooses Nagisa Kanō, a Japanese schoolgirl, as her partner.

Simultaneously, the Cthulhu pilot, Cobalt, prepares to lead their champion unit, a giant mecha called Delos Theta, against the human military with the ultimate objective of flushing out Iczer-One and destroying her before she can unite with her partner. First the aliens transport in their battle station, a giant black marble pyramid, which appears above the skyline of Tokyo, causing widespread devastation. Then Cobalt launches and begins to destroy the city and all military forces in the area. Iczer-One senses the disturbance and teleports Nagisa and herself into her "other self", the Iczer-Robo, to confront Delos Theta. Initially, the battle fares poorly for Iczer-1, but eventually Nagisa's rage over her parents' murder consumes her, and she triggers, unleashing a huge energy beam that cripples the enemy robot. Nagisa then delivers the final blow herself, killing Cobalt in the process.

The Cthulhu leader, Sir Violet, responds by developing her own version of Iczer-1, the burgundy-haired Iczer-2, and using the traumatized lover of Cobalt, Sepia, as her partner. In the following days, warfare between activated vedim and human forces, lay waste to most of Earth's civilization, turning the world into a post-apocalyptic wasteland. Nagisa discovers a young girl named Sayoko in the ruins of Japan, tending her unconscious mother. She takes the family into her home, but the mother turns into a vedim, and numerous others begin to teleport into the house. Nagisa uses a bracelet given to her by Iczer-One and is able to protect Sayoko and herself within a force field.

Iczer-1 fights Iczer-2 in a massive battle over the ruins of Japan and is defeated, but escapes to regroup with Nagisa and rescue her. Iczer-2 and Sepia arrive in their giant robot, Iczer-Sigma. Iczer-Robo appears, and Nagisa leaves Sayoko with her bracelet before going with Iczer-1 to fight. Again the battle goes poorly for Iczer-Robo until, in a fit of sadism, Iczer-2 stomps on Sayoko, who has come to watch. Immediately Sepia's morale is broken and Nagisa once again triggers the beam weapon of Iczer-Robo, destroying Iczer Sigma. Iczer-2 barely manages to teleport away before the robot explodes. Sepia chooses not to escape, wanting to be reunited with Cobalt.

Iczer-1 is still badly injured from her fight with Iczer-2, and the two relax in a country meadow to recover. Sayoko is shown to be alive, thanks to Nagisa's bracelet. Iczer-2 retreats to a shadow realm to brood over her defeat before returning with two elite armored vedims, Reddas and Blueba, and abducts Nagisa. Iczer-1 must then single-handedly assault the Cthulhu fortress to get Nagisa back and kill Big Gold. Meanwhile, Iczer-2 tries to get Nagisa to willingly join her, threatening to otherwise force her. By the time Iczer-1 has reached the chamber where Nagisa is being kept, it is already too late. She has been placed under powerful mind control by Iczer-2, and Iczer-1 is forced to kill her. In dying, however, Nagisa's spirit merges with Iczer-1 and for the first time they fully synchronize. Iczer-1, fueled by Nagisa's sacrifice, defeats Iczer-2 and has her final confrontation with Big Gold. She later fights and kills Iczer-2, who reveals she just wanted a partner like Nagisa.

Big Gold relates that she and Iczer-1 were both created at the same moment, by an ancient alien machine built to grant the desires of its creators. The Matriarch of the Cthulhu, who would eventually become Sir Violet, had passed within range of the machine just as she exclaimed in despair that her race would die in space and never find a new home. At that moment, Big Gold had appeared to tell her that her wish was granted. She had changed her idyllic society into a fascist nightmare, and had mutated the once benign vedim into their current parasitic forms. Big Gold was an embodiment of "Desire" and it had remade the Cthulhu race. Iczer-1 was the other half of this prophecy. She was "Conscience" and her role was to fulfill the Cthulhu matriarch's wish and destroy them all on the eve of finding a new homeworld.

Iczer-1 destroys her. In a final act, using the power of their synchronization and tapping into the ancient wish-granting machine, Iczer-1 is able to restore Earth to the way it was before the Cthulhu attack. The Cthulhu fade even from memory and Nagisa is left in the moment where she first appeared in the movie, daydreaming and late for school. She briefly runs into Iczer-1, but does not know who she is. After saying farewell, Iczer-1 then leaves the Earth with the Cthulhu ship to find a new homeworld.

Voice actors

Mr. and Mrs. Kanō:

Theme songs
Act I Ending:

Lyrics: Fumiko Okada
Composition: Michiaki Watanabe
Arrangement: Michiaki Watanabe
Artist: Miki Kakizawa

Act II Ending:
Never Run Away
Lyrics: Fumiko Okada
Composition: Michiaki Watanabe
Arrangement: Michiaki Watanabe
Artist: Yuukou Kusonoki

Act III Ending:

Lyrics: Fumiko Okada
Composition: Michiaki Watanabe
Arrangement: Michiaki Watanabe
Artist: Miki Kakizawa

Release guide
Episode 1

VHS: October 19, 1985
Laser Disc: December 4, 1991

Episode 2

VHS: July 23, 1986
Laser Disc: January 10, 1992

"Making Of" Special Episode

VHS: December 20. 1986

Episode 3

VHS: March 4, 1987
Laser Disc: February 20, 1992

"Movie"

VHS: September 25, 1987
Laser Disc: September 25, 1987

Laser Disc Box Set

Laser Disc: May 25, 1998

DVD Release

DVD: November 24, 2000

Video games
 Iczer-1, Kanou Nagisa, and Iczer Robo make appearances in the Nintendo DS game Super Robot Taisen L for the Nintendo DS as playable ally units. Iczer-2, Iczer-Sigma, and Big Gold also make appearances as enemy units (Iczer-2 and Iczer Sigma become playable allies later in the game). Iczer-1 and Iczer-2 also have a combination attack with Iczer-3. Each of the Iczers alone on foot is comparable in power to two or three Real Robot units, with Iczer Robo and Iczer-Sigma able to match the likes of Mazinger Z and Getter Robo in power.

See also
 Adventure! Iczer-3
 Iczer Girl Iczelion

References

 "Fight Iczer-1: Act I". Animag: The Magazine of Japanese Animation Vol. 1, No. 3, 1987.
 "Fight Iczer-1: Acts II & III". Animag: The Magazine of Japanese Animation Vol. 1, No. 4, 1987.
 Iczer-1 Mediamix Special: Section 1. Printed in Japan at Kadokawa Shoten 1986. .

External links
 Fight! Iczer One
 

1985 anime OVAs
Anime International Company
Horror anime and manga
Mecha anime and manga
LGBT in anime and manga
Seinen manga
Yuri (genre) anime and manga